The Extra Mile – Points of Light Volunteer Pathway is a national monument in Washington D.C.

The Extra Mile or Extra Mile may also refer to:

Arts and education

Music
Extra Mile (album), a 1990 album by Shenandoah
The Extra Mile, a 1992 album by Al Denson
"The Extra Mile", a song on Tra te e il mare, 2000 Laura Pausini album
"The Extra Mile", a song on Things Go Better with RJ and AL, 2006 Soul Position album
"The Extra Mile", a song on This Is Where I Came In, 2001 Bee Gees album
"Extra Mile", song on Deeper Water, a 1995 Paul Kelly album

Television
"The Extra Mile", an episode of Drive (2007 TV series)
"The Extra Mile", an episode of the TV series All Saints (season 7)
"Extra Mile", an episode of Murphy's Law (UK TV series)

Printed material
The Extra Mile (book), a 1962 book of selected short stories by Ivy R. Doherty
The Extra Mile (magazine), a publication of Southern New Hampshire University
The Extra Mile: One Woman's Personal Journey to Ultra-Running Greatness, a book by Pam Reed

Other uses
Extra Mile Endurathon, a walking endurance event
Extra Mile Education Foundation, an educational charity founded 1989 in Pittsburgh, Pennsylvania, USA
 To go the extra mile, an idiom about the Roman mile meaning to do more than is required

See also
My Extra Mile, an episode of the TV series Scrubs
 Plus ultra (motto)
 "That Extra Mile", 1994 single by The Winans
 "That Extra Mile", 2004 single by Ricky (band)